Osumenyi is a town in Nnewi South Local government Area of Anambra State, Nigeria. It is in South Eastern Nigeria and is made up of Igbo speaking people. Osumenyi has a hard working and well to do population who have businesses across Nigeria. The town is surrounded by greenery and farms with homes of nuclear families. The Igbo people living around here live in families close to each other and are Christian oriented.

www.osumenyinews.com is Osumenyi's 'unofficial' news website. It is dedicated to reporting news on the positive developments and events within and around the town.

References

Populated places in Anambra State